Devendra Agrawal is an Indian politician and a member of the 16th Legislative Assembly of India. He represents the Sadabad constituency of Uttar Pradesh and is a member of the Samajwadi Party political party.

Early life and education
Devendra Agrawal was born in Hathras district. He attended the Gandhi Inter College, Mathura and is educated till tenth grade.

Political career
Devendra Agrawal has been a MLA for one term. He represented the Sadabad constituency and is a member of the Samajwadi Party political party.

Posts held

See also
 Sadabad (Assembly constituency)
 Sixteenth Legislative Assembly of Uttar Pradesh
 Uttar Pradesh Legislative Assembly

References

Samajwadi Party politicians
Uttar Pradesh MLAs 2012–2017
People from Hathras district
1965 births
Living people